Predel (Cyrillic: Предел), a Slavic word for "bound, limit", may refer to:
 Predel (Bulgaria), a saddle and mountain pass dividing the Rila and Pirin mountains
 Predel Point on Anvers Island in Antarctica, named after Predel in Bulgaria
 Predil Pass, a mountain pass between Slovenia and Italy
 Predeal, a town and mountain resort in Romania
Predel, Šmarje pri Jelšah, a settlement in Slovenia